The High School Affiliated to Fudan University (Simplified Chinese:  fùdàndàxuéfùshǔzhōngxué, or 复旦大学附属中学, Acronym: FDFZ) is a public boarding high school located in Yangpu, Shanghai, near the Fudan University campus. It is one of the most selective high schools in China. With its special emphasis on the humanities, High School Affiliated to Fudan University has acquired a national reputation of premier education on Chinese culture.

Summary 

The High School Affiliated to Fudan University was established in the 1950s and used to be directly subordinate to the Shanghai Education Commission (上海市教育委员会) and Fudan University. It is now under the co-direction of both organizations.

The school has a campus spanning 50,640 meters squared. At present, its buildings take up about 42,000 meters squared, while its fields take up nearly 10,500 meters squared. The school has a library, which contains two reading rooms with a combined area 615 meters squared and a seating capacity of 364. The high school also has several specialized rooms, including several laboratories, two rooms for computer science, as well as two additional audio-visual rooms.

The school has a domestic alumni association operated directly by the school administrators. The Fudan Fuzhong Overseas Foundation is an independently run but closely affiliated overseas alumni association based in New York City. The high school has several sister schools, including, but not limited to Sidwell Friends School in Washington, D.C. (where Presidential children such as Chelsea Clinton [1997], Tricia Nixon Cox [1964], Julie Nixon Eisenhower [1966], Malia Obama [2016], Sasha Obama [2019] attended), and Punahou School in Honolulu.

See also
 Fudan International School

References

External links
 Official Website (Simplified Chinese)
 Fudan Fuzhong Overseas Foundation
 Fudan International School

Schools in Shanghai
High schools in Shanghai
Fudan University